Mohamed Hedi Gaaloul (born 30 April 1989) is a Tunisian footballer who plays as a goalkeeper for CS Sfaxien.

References

 
1989 births
CS Sfaxien players
Living people
Tunisian footballers
Association football goalkeepers